Sex Music may refer to:

 Sex Music (album), an album by punk/glam rock band Toilet Böys.
 "Sex Music" (song), a song by American singer Tank.